Kadon Kho railway station is a railway station located in Chang Pi Subdistrict, Sikhoraphum District, Surin Province.

References 

Railway stations in Thailand
Surin province